Tom Bowling may refer to:
A character in the novel The Adventures of Roderick Random
An 18th-century song by Charles Dibdin
The fourth movement of the Fantasia on British Sea Songs by Sir Henry Wood, which uses the melody of Dibdin's song
A bay in North Cape, New Zealand